Travis Mitchell Hansen (born April 15, 1978) is an American former professional basketball player. He played for the Atlanta Hawks of the National Basketball Association (NBA). Hansen played college basketball for Utah Valley and BYU.

Both his junior high school, Orem Junior High, and his high school, Mountain View High School, retired his jersey number, #24. Hansen was the first person inducted into his high school's hall of fame. He was drafted into the NBA by the Hawks, played two years for the Hawks and nine years in the EuroLeague. 

After retiring from professional basketball, Hansen went on to be a successful entrepreneur founding Tesani Companies that includes, Tech 9, Lift Credit, Sunshine Heroes Foundation, and Eddy  a SaaS HR solution company.

Early life and education
Hansen was born in Provo, Utah to Scott W. Hansen and Laurie Ann Hansen (née Mitchell). His mother died of pancreatic cancer in 1997 when Hansen was 18 years old.

Hansen starred on his basketball team and graduated from Mountain View High School, where he averaged nearly a triple-double, 18.6 ppg, 8.4 rpg, 7.5 apg and was team captain of the Bruins when they were named Region Champions and Consolation Champions in 1996.

Hansen began his college basketball career at Utah Valley State College in his hometown of Orem, Utah, where he averaged 11.2 ppg and 3.6 rpg. and he received the Iron Man award.

Hansen went on to serve as a full-time missionary for the Church of Jesus Christ of Latter-day Saints in Santiago, Chile, for two years. One week after returning from his mission, he played in a tournament in California where he drove baseline and broke the backboard. That incident landed him in a Los Angeles hospital, where he received multiple stitches.

After being heavily recruited by Utah, Cal, Indiana, New Mexico, UNLV, Arizona, Arizona State, and many other teams, he signed for Brigham Young University. Hansen transferred from Utah Valley University to Brigham Young University, where he graduated with a BA in health science. He later earned a certificate of non-profit management from Duke University.

BYU
Hansen played basketball for the BYU Cougars from 2000 to 2003. During his time there, he was also known as "Elder 8 Mile", for his similar appearance to rapper Eminem. He was a two-time All-MWC selection, MWC Defensive Player of the Year, and a two-time All-District selection. He finished with a 44–1 home record (all-time best in BYU history), won two MWC championships, and was selected with the 8th pick in the 2nd round in the NBA draft. With his selection by the Atlanta Hawks in 2003, he became the first BYU men's basketball player to be drafted since Shawn Bradley in 1993. Hansen was known for his defensive ability, vertical leap, intensity, and outside shooting. He posted career highs of 30 points and 17 rebounds in a single game against Pepperdine during his junior year.

Professional career
Hansen was voted by ESPN as one of the top five guards in the NBA draft in 2003. His draft class included players LeBron James, Dwyane Wade, Carmelo Anthony, and Chris Bosh. Hansen was drafted by the Hawks in the second round of the 2003 NBA Draft, 37th overall. He signed a shoe contract with Nike.

Atlanta Hawks
Hansen signed a two-year deal with the Atlanta Hawks following the draft. He played 41 games for them the first season, starting four, averaging 3.0 points per game. He had a stress fracture in his right foot that caused him to miss 40 games. His career-high was against the Boston Celtics; he played 41 minutes, scored 14 points, 6 rebounds and had 4 assists.

This was Hansen's only time in the NBA as he spent the remainder of his professional basketball career playing overseas. His final NBA game was played on April 14th, 2004 in a 132 - 137 loss to the Boston Celtics where he recorded  13 points, 6 rebounds, 4 assists, 1 steal and 1 block.

Spain: Tau Ceramica
In 2004–2005, he crossed the Atlantic to sign a two year deal for TAU Ceramica, who won the 2005 Spanish Supercup, the 2006 Spanish King's Cup and back-to-back appearances in the EuroLeague Final Four and Spanish League Finals. He averaged 10.5 ppg and 3.3 rpg in his last year in Vitoria before heading to Dynamo Moscow. He was voted the favorite player in 2004 by fans in Vitoria, Spain.

Russia: Dynamo Moscow
In 2006, the ULEB Cup (now called EuroCup Basketball) champions Dynamo Moscow signed Hansen on a two-year contract. After helping his team reach the EuroLeague's Top-16 and averaging 15 ppg, he was placed on the injured list for the rest of the season after suffering a torn Achilles tendon. In 2007, Hansen helped Dynamo take third place in the ULEB Cup (EuroCup Basketball) and averaged 17.5 ppg, 3.3 rpg while shooting 56.4 FG and 46.3% 3PT.

In February 2008, Hansen extended his contract with Dynamo Moscow signing a three-year deal, and Russian President Vladimir Putin signed a decree giving Hansen Russian citizenship. In 2008–2009, Hansen, coached by David Blatt, again led Dynamo to the EuroCup final four in Turin, Italy, averaging 16.4 ppg. In March 2008, Hansen received Russian citizenship or a "red passport" in order to allow him to play for the senior men's Russian national basketball team at the 2008 Beijing Olympics. He was the second American player ever to receive a Russian passport. However, he did not actually play for Russia.

Spain: Real Madrid
In July 2009, he returned to the Spanish Liga ACB, signing a two-year contract with Spanish power Real Madrid. Hansen signed a shoe deal with Adidas who is the main sponsor of Real Madrid. Madrid revamped the entire roster signing many of the best players in Europe and also one of the best coaches in Ettore Messina. They reached the top 8 in EuroLeague, the Finals in the Spanish Supercup, and the Finals of the Spanish Cup.

In May 2010, during a practice session with Real Madrid, Hansen suffered a herniated disc and had to have a discectomy.

Russia: Khimki
In December 2010 he signed a contract with Khimki Moscow Region until the end of 2010–2011 season. In April 2011, Hansen helped his team win the VTB United League championship by hitting five free throws in the last seconds of the game.

Post-basketball career
In September 2011, Hansen retired from professional basketball. He is the author of The Next Few Years Will Change Your Life, a book published by Deseret Book in 2012. Hansen’s business and civic achievements include being the recipient of BYU's 2015 Young Alumni Distinguished Service Award and honors as one of the 100 Most Influential People in Utah. In 2013, BYU TV aired a documentary about Hansen and his career in a show called Legends. In 2020, Hansen appeared in an episode of Dream Home Makeover.

Personal life
Hansen and his wife LaRee live in Mapleton, Utah. They have five children. Hansen and his family are active members of The Church of Jesus Christ of Latter-Day Saints, in which Hansen has served as a temple ordinance worker, high councilor, ward mission leader, elders quorum president, bishop, stake presidency counselor, and missionary in the Santiago West Chile mission.

The UVU basketball facility has a center named after Hansen. The new Travis Hansen Strength and Conditioning Center includes roughly 1,300 square feet, with custom-made nine-foot high racks, dumbbells up to 125 pounds, and an array of power and conditioning tools.

Philanthropy

Sunshine Heroes Foundation
After visiting orphanages in Moscow, Russia, Hansen and his wife LaRee founded the Little Heroes Foundation in 2007. In 2013, the foundation officially changed its name to the Sunshine Heroes Foundation, representing a long-term partnership with the founding sponsor, Nature's Sunshine. Brigham Young University gave Hansen the 2015 Distinguished Alumni Award for his work with Sunshine Heroes. The foundation has built 10 children's centers around the world including in Nepal, Africa, Russia, Thailand, Panama, Dominican Republic, and Nicaragua.

Awards and honors 
Hansen's companies have achieved the following accolades:
Eddy named best company to work for, best HR/Staffing company, and best payroll service in 2022. 
 Tesani Companies: 5x consecutively: 2017, 2018, 2019, 2020 and 2021 Best Companies to work for 
 Salt Lake Tribune named them one of the best companies to work for in 2018, 2019, 2020, and 2021
 Utah Valley Magazine named him one of the coolest entrepreneurs in 2018. 
 Eddy voted number two best payroll company in Utah Valley in 2020 and 2021. 
 Fortune Best Small Workplaces 2020

References

External links

Euroleague Profile
NBA.com Profile 
ACB.com Profile 
KSL.com Profile
 https://eddy.com
 https://www.spreadsunshine.org

1978 births
Living people
20th-century Mormon missionaries
American emigrants to Russia
American expatriate basketball people in Russia
American expatriate basketball people in Spain
American men's basketball players
American Mormon missionaries in Chile
Atlanta Hawks draft picks
Atlanta Hawks players
Basketball players from Utah
BC Dynamo Moscow players
BC Khimki players
BYU Cougars men's basketball players
Junior college men's basketball players in the United States
Latter Day Saints from Utah
Liga ACB players
Naturalised citizens of Russia
Real Madrid Baloncesto players
Russian men's basketball players
Saski Baskonia players
Shooting guards
Small forwards
Sportspeople from Orem, Utah
Sportspeople from Provo, Utah
Utah Valley Wolverines men's basketball players